Gamma test may refer to:

 Gamma test (statistics)
 An alternate name for "release candidate" in the software release life cycle